Kenneth C. Klein (born October 3, 1959) is a windsurfer who represented the United States Virgin Islands. He competed in the Windglider event at the 1984 Summer Olympics.

References

External links
 
 

1959 births
Living people
United States Virgin Islands male sailors (sport)
Olympic sailors of the United States Virgin Islands
Sailors at the 1984 Summer Olympics – Windglider
Place of birth missing (living people)